Cirrhochrista spissalis is a moth in the family Crambidae. It was described by Achille Guenée in 1854. It is found on Java and in Japan and Taiwan.

References

Moths described in 1854
Spilomelinae
Moths of Asia